John Clayton was  a rugby union international who represented England in the first international in 1871.

Early life
John Clayton was born on 24 August 1848 in Liverpool. He attended Rugby School.

Rugby union career
Clayton had played rugby football at school and went on to play for Liverpool. He made his international debut on 27 March 1871 at Edinburgh in the first international match and first meeting between Scotland and England match. He was one of ten Old Rugbeians playing in that match.

Career and later life
Clayton worked as a cotton broker, based in Liverpool. He was active in other sports outside of rugby and was known to have been a keen shooter and golfer, and also captained the Royal Liverpool Golf Club.

References

1848 births
1924 deaths
English rugby union players
England international rugby union players
Rugby union forwards
Rugby union players from Liverpool
Liverpool St Helens F.C. players